Ken Millin (born January 29, 1975 in Brampton, Ontario) is a former indoor lacrosse player for the Rochester Knighthawks in the National Lacrosse League. He has won five NLL championships (four with the Toronto Rock and one with Rochester.

Millin currently works as a school teacher at Prince Philip Public School in St. Catharines, Ontario and has a wife (Jennifer) and daughter (Raiya).

Statistics

NLL
Reference:

References

External links
Bio at Rochester Knighthawks web site

1975 births
Living people
Canadian lacrosse players
Rochester Knighthawks players
Sportspeople from Brampton